Rod's Pot is a limestone cave above Burrington Combe in the Mendip Hills, in Somerset, England.

The cave was first excavated in 1944 by the University of Bristol Spelæological Society. It is one of a line of swallets marking the junction of the Limestone shales with the Carboniferous Limestones where water running off the Old Red Sandstone of Blackdown finds its way underground.   
Further excavation has now linked Rod's Pot to nearby Bath Swallet.

The cave was originally known as Pearce's Pot after Rodney Pearce.

Main features
Rod's Pot is formed mainly of vertical rift passages, probably in the original joints in the limestone which have been enlarged by water action. The north wall of the main chamber is a continuation of the main chamber in Read's Cave, a quarter mile to the west.

It contains a stalagmite pillar formation and several stalactite curtains.

A further passageway leads to the terminal pothole.

At the base of the Bear Pit, a 3 metre deep chamber reached through a small hole halfway through the cave, a pool containing a small community of Niphargus fontanus been found.

See also 
 Caves of the Mendip Hills

References 

Caves of the Mendip Hills
Limestone caves
Wild caves